Lyons is an Australian architecture firm based in Melbourne. Established in 1996 by brothers Corbett Lyon and Carey Lyon, they were soon joined by third brother Cameron, Neil Appleton and Adrian Stanic, and are all now directors. Lyons is known for large commercial and institutional buildings such as the RMIT Swanston Academic Building, Melbourne, the Australian Institute of Architects (Victoria), 41 Exhibition St, Melbourne, the John Curtin School of Medical Research in Canberra, the Central Institute of TAFE in Perth, the Queensland Children's Hospital in Brisbane, the School of Medicine and Menzies Research Institute in Hobart and the School of Medicine and Research in Sydney.

The Lyons brothers are third generation Melbourne architects, grandsons of concrete pioneer and hotel designer Leslie M Perrott Snr, whose firm later became Perrott Lyon Mathieson. Their father was Ron Lyon, a director of the Perrott firm in the 1960s–90s, who married architectural delineator Marietta Perrott, daughter of Leslie M Perrott Snr. Les Perrott Jnr also worked in the firm, becoming director in the 1960s–80s, and their uncle Eric Lyons was also an architect.

Projects

 New Queensland Children's Hospital, Brisbane, 
 BHP Billiton Global Headquarters, Melbourne
 John Curtin School of Medical Research, Canberra
 Central Institute of TAFE, Perth
 Menzies Research Institute, Hobart
 Royal Hobart Hospital, Hobart
 UWS School of Medicine, Sydney
 Melbourne Brain Centre, Melbourne
 Lyon Housemuseum, Melbourne
 Kangan Institute, Automotive Centre of Excellence, Melbourne
 Headly Bull Centre, Australian National University, Canberra 
 New School of Law at University of NSW, Sydney
 Victoria University Online Training Centre, St Albans (Victorian Architecture Medal Winner)
 Marine and Freshwater Research Institute, Queenscliff
 School of Medicine, Hobart
 Institute for Molecular Science, La Trobe University, Melbourne
 RMIT Swanston Academic Building, Melbourne
 Australian Institute of Architects, 41 Exhibition St, Melbourne

References

Further reading
Clark, Justine (2012): More:The Architecture of Lyons 1996-2011, Thames&Hudson,

External links

Official website

Architecture firms of Australia
Companies based in Melbourne
1996 establishments in Australia
Architecture firms based in Victoria (Australia)
21st-century Australian architects